Polonium hexafluoride (PoF6) is a possible chemical compound of polonium and fluorine and one of the seventeen known binary hexafluorides.

Synthesis
The synthesis of PoF6 via the reaction

 + 3  → 

was attempted in 1945, but the attempt was unsuccessful. The boiling point was predicted to be about −40 °C.

208PoF6 was probably successfully synthesised via the same reaction in 1960 with the more stable isotope 208Po, where a volatile polonium fluoride was produced, but it was not fully characterized before it underwent radiolysis and decomposed to polonium tetrafluoride.

References

Polonium compounds
Metal halides
Hexafluorides
Chalcohalides
Substances discovered in the 1960s